Paracarpais is a genus of mites in the family Parasitidae.

Species
 Paracarpais exilis (Banks, 1900)     
 Paracarpais furcatus (Canestrini, 1882)     
 Paracarpais infernalis (Willmann, 1940)     
 Paracarpais kraepelini (Berlese, 1904)     
 Paracarpais lunulata (Muller, 1869)     
 Paracarpais multidentatus Schmolzer, 1995     
 Paracarpais niveus (Wankel, 1861)

References

Parasitidae